Undraa Agvaanluvsan (Mongolian: Агваанлувсангийн Ундраа; born in 1973 in Ulaanbaatar, Mongolia) is a Mongolian politician who has been a member of the State Great Khural since 2016. With her internationally recognised scientific background and career, Undraa is considered to be one of the highly educated women and a scholar to ever enter politics in Mongolia.

Early life and career
Undraa was born in 1973 in Ulaanbaatar, Mongolia. Upon completion of her secondary education at the first and only intensive school of mathematics and physics at the time in Mongolia, Undraa attended the National University of Mongolia where she studied physics, graduating with a bachelor's degree in 1994 and a master's degree in 1995. Undraa then continued her studies in physics at the International Centre for Theoretical Physics in Trieste, Italy where she received a diploma in high energy physics in 1997. She was awarded her PhD from North Carolina State University in Raleigh, North Carolina in 2002, studying nuclear reactions and quantum chaos in nuclei and becoming a Doctor of Philosophy in Physics at the age of 29.

Lawrence Livermore National Laboratory
Following her studies, Undraa conducted post-doctoral research and worked as a post-doctoral staff member and research scientist at North Carolina State University and the Lawrence Livermore National Laboratory. She published and co-authored several dozen articles in peer-reviewed journals.

Stanford University
Undraa was a CISAC science fellow and visiting professor during 2008–2010, and an affiliate from 2010 to date. Her research interests at CISAC focused on nuclear energy studies. At Stanford, Undraa directed an undergraduate research project under the auspices of the Bing Overseas Studies Program. She also taught nuclear energy policy in the International Policy Studies program.

Return to Mongolia
Upon returning to Mongolia, Undraa was appointed as deputy director of the Institute of Strategic Studies of the National Security Council and was advisor to the Minister of Mineral Resources and Energy. In 2010, Undraa was appointed as Ambassador-at-large at the Ministry of Foreign Affairs of Mongolia.

She is a co-chair of Mongolia chapter of the Women Corporate Directors , a global organisation of women who serve on public and private boards. Undraa has served and serves on several corporate and advisory boards of reputable organisations including the Mongolian Oil Shale Company and the advisory board of Rio Tinto Mongolia which develops the Oyu Tolgoi mine, one of the world's largest copper-gold mines and is located in the South Gobi region of Mongolia.

Political career

Strategy Academy

Prior to being elected as a Member of Parliament in 2016, Undraa worked as a director of the Strategy Academy, a think-tank affiliated with the Mongolian People's Party, which was originally established in 1955. A decision was made in October 2013 at the 27th Party Congress of the Mongolian People's Party to reform and re-organise the Strategy Academy as an independent policy research institute. This reform was led by Undraa working towards re-establishing the Strategy Academy as Mongolia's leading independent multidisciplinary research organisation and developing reformative public policies and strategic policy advice through rigorous analysis of the socio-economic development of the country. During her tenure as the director of the Strategy Academy, the Strategy Academy developed the Mongolian People's Party's manifesto for the General Election 2016 based on its one-year research targeting the pressing needs of the every branches of the society. Undraa was instrumental in carrying out the opinion polls for the General Election 2016 and in the candidate selection for the General Election 2016 which resulted in the Mongolian People's Party winning 65 of the Parliament's 76 seats.

Member of Parliament
Undraa was elected as the member of the Parliament for Bayangol District, Ulaanbaatar (constituency 67) in 2016 from the Mongolian People's Party. As a Member of Parliament, Undraa serves on the Standing Committee on Security and Foreign Policy and the Standing Committee on Social Policy, Education, Culture and Science respectively.

On 10 February 2018, she was appointed as a chair of the Parliamentary Subcommittee on Sustainable Development.

Responsible Mining Support Group within the Parliament of Mongolia
Undraa initiated the establishment of the Responsible Mining Support Group in the Parliament whereby the Responsible Mining Support Group was established by MPs A. Undraa, L.Amarzayaa, G.Temuulen, O.Sodbileg, B.Batzorig, Ts.Garamjav, Y.Sodbaatar and J.Bat-Erdene on 14 February 2017.

Awards
Undraa's awards and honors include the Distinguished Service Award of the Petroleum Industry of Mongolia, Distinguished Service Award of Environmental Protection for Mongolia, and an Asia 21 Fellow of Asia Society. She is President-emeritus of MASA - Mongolian US Alumni Association.

Personal life
Undraa is married to fellow nuclear physicist Dr. Dashdorj Dugersuren. They have two sons.

Wikileaks record
SUMMARY: Dr. UNDRAA Agvaanluvsan, professor of nuclear energy issues and policy at Stanford University and newly appointed deputy director of the in-house think tank of Mongolia's National Security Council, informed Embassy officers on December 26 that the DPRK and Mongolia continue to discuss increased bilateral trade and exchanges. This will be a major topic of discussion during Foreign Minister Zandanshatar's visit to the DPRK at the end of January 2010.

Undraa also discussed a separate effort by her and other Stanford faculty to host a US-DPRK-Mongolia trilateral meeting in Mongolia in Spring 2010. Separately, Undraa described a proposed Mongolia Nuclear Initiative to establish an international uranium enrichment zone that could provide nuclear fuel to the region while supporting geopolitical stability through Mongolia's neutrality and repudiation of weaponization ambitions. Finally, Undraa expressed a strong interest in Peabody-sponsored mining scholarships at the University of Arizona.

Mitchell Foundation
With her husband Dr. Dashdorj Dugersuren, Undraa co-founded the Mitchell Foundation, with a mission to support science, education and leadership development. The Mongolia Young Leaders Program which Undraa and Dr. Dashdorj Dugersuren initiated has grown into the largest program of its kind intended for bright young Mongolians studying all around the world and span off as a separate program called the Mongolian Young Leaders Network of which Undraa remains as an Honorary President.

Mongolian Federation of Draughts
Undraa is the President of the Mongolian Federation of Draughts. Upon assuming this position, she stated that she would make much effort to convince the younger generation to take up draughts at an early age and shared her intention to set up draughts clubs at the secondary schools.

References

External links
 Official website of Undraa Agvaanluvsan
 Profile at the Parliament of Mongolia

1973 births
Living people
21st-century Mongolian women politicians
21st-century Mongolian politicians
Mongolian People's Party politicians
Members of the State Great Khural
Date of birth missing (living people)
Mongolian expatriates in Italy
Mongolian expatriates in the United States
National University of Mongolia alumni
North Carolina State University alumni
People from Ulaanbaatar